This is a list of archives in Portugal.

Archives in Portugal 
 
 
 
 , University of Coimbra
 , Coimbra

District archives

  (est. 1917), Braga District 
 , Aveiro District
 Arquivo Distrital de Beja
 Arquivo Distrital de Bragança
 Arquivo Distrital de Castelo Branco
 Arquivo Distrital de Évora
 Arquivo Distrital de Faro
 Arquivo Distrital da Guarda
 Arquivo Distrital de Leiria
 Arquivo Distrital de Lisboa (abolished in 2012; materials transferred to the Torre do Tombo National Archive)
 Arquivo Distrital de Portalegre
 Arquivo Distrital do Porto (est. 1931) 
 Arquivo Distrital de Santarém
 Arquivo Distrital de Setúbal 
 Arquivo Distrital de Viana do Castelo
 Arquivo Distrital de Vila Real 
 Arquivo Distrital de Viseu

Municipal archives

Alentejo Region
 Arquivo Municipal de Beja
 Arquivo Municipal de Estremoz
 Arquivo Municipal de Mértola
 Arquivo Municipal de Moura
 Arquivo Municipal de Reguengos de Monsaraz

Algarve Region
 Arquivo Histórico Municipal de Albufeira
 Arquivo Municipal de Lagoa
 Arquivo Municipal de Loulé
 Arquivo Municipal de Olhão
 Arquivo Municipal de Silves
 Arquivo Municipal de Tavira
 Arquivo Municipal de Vila do Bispo
 Arquivo Municipal de Vila Real de Santo António

Centro Region
 Arquivo Municipal de Benavente
 Arquivo Municipal de Constância
 Arquivo Municipal de Estarreja
 Arquivo Municipal de Ferreira do Zêzere
 Centro de Documentação de Ílhavo - Arquivo Municipal
 Arquivo Municipal de Lourinhã
 Arquivo Municipal da Mealhada
 Arquivo Municipal da Murtosa
 Arquivo Municipal de Ovar
 Arquivo Municipal de São Pedro do Sul
 Arquivo Municipal de Torres Novas
 Arquivo Municipal de Torres Vedras

Lisboa Region
 Arquivo Histórico Municipal de Cascais, Cascais

Norte Region
 Arquivo Municipal de Arcos de Valdevez
 Arquivo Municipal de Arouca
 Arquivo Municipal de Caminha
 Arquivo Municipal de Melgaço
 Arquivo Municipal de Monção
 Arquivo Municipal de Oliveira de Azeméis
 Arquivo Municipal de Paredes de Coura
 Arquivo Municipal de Ponte da Barca
 Arquivo Municipal de Ponte de Lima
 Arquivo Municipal de Santa Maria da Feira
 Arquivo Municipal de Vale de Cambra
 Arquivo Municipal de Valença
 Arquivo Municipal de Viana do Castelo
 Arquivo Municipal de Vila Nova de Cerveira
 Arquivo Municipal de Vila Verde

National archives
 Arquivo Central da Marinha, Comissão Cultural da Marinha, Portuguese Navy, Lisbon 
 Arquivo Histórico Diplomatico of the Ministry of Foreign Affairs (Portugal) 
 Arquivo Histórico Militar, Lisbon
 Arquivo Historico Parlamentar, Lisbon
 Arquivo Histórico Ultramarino
 Biblioteca e Arquivo Histórico do Ministério das Obras Públicas, Transportes, e Comunicaçôes (Ministry of Planning and Infrastructure)
 Biblioteca Nacional de Portugal (National Library)
 Cinemateca Portuguesa
 National Archive for Portugal’s Directorate General of Cultural Heritage (SIPA) 
 Torre do Tombo National Archive

Other
There are many other archives in Portugal, such as:
  Arquivo & Biblioteca, Lisbon (related to 20th c. politician Mário Soares)

See also 

 Archivo.pt (digital archive of the World Wide Web)
 List of public archives in Portugal (pt)
 Libraries in Portugal
 List of museums in Portugal
 Culture of Portugal
  
 Open access in Portugal

References

This article incorporates information from the Portuguese Wikipedia.

Bibliography
in English
 
 
 
 
 
 
 
 

in Portuguese
  1914-

External links

  
 
 

 
Archives
Archives
Portugal
Archives